Giri is a 2004 Indian Tamil language action comedy film written and directed by Sundar C, starring Arjun in the lead role, with Ramya, Reema Sen, Devayani, Vadivelu, and Prakash Raj among others enacting supporting roles. The film was released on 1 October 2004. The movie was remade in Kannada in 2020 as Shivarjuna starring his nephew Chiranjeevi Sarja. This film is also noted to be actress Khushbu's productional debut in her production company house, Avni Cinemax. The film was dubbed into Telugu under the same name.

Plot
Two villages, Veerapandi Puram and Soolachery, on either side of a river are always feuding, as the headmen Veerasamy (Vinu Chakravarthy) and Sethupathy (FEFSI Vijayan) have personal enmity. Due to some misunderstanding, Sethupathy's children die, and the blame falls on Veerasamy. Sethupathy seeks revenge and tries to kill Veerasamy's son Surya but Surya is saved by his servant's son Giri, but the boy Surya disappears.

20 years later, Shiva (Arjun) is seen arriving in Kumbakonam, living with a bakery owner named Veerabagu (Vadivelu). Shiva's mission is to protect Devayani and her son from all the threats of Sethupathy and his gangsters. Priya (Reema Sen) walks into the bakery claiming ownership of the bakery. Though she dislikes and torments Veerabhagu, she falls for Shiva. Sooner, Shiva's true identity is revealed as he saves Devayani and her son from being murdered by Sethupathy's son.

When questioned about his identity, it is revealed in a flashback that Shiva is Giri, Veerasamy's hatchet man. Devayani's husband DSP Chandrashekhar is actually Suryaprakash (Prakash Raj), Veerasamy's long-lost son whom Sethupathy is trying to kill. To protect the rest of the family, Giri was sent to bring them back to the village. In the village, Giri has another love interest named Devaki (Ramya), who is Sethupathy's niece.

All this leads to a bloody climax during a boat race, and Sethupathy and his family are wiped out by Giri. The film ends with both girls clinging on to Giri.

Cast

 Arjun as Giri (Shiva)
 Divya Spandana as Devaki
 Reema as Priya 
 Vadivelu as Veerabagu
 Prakash Raj as Suryaprakash "Surya" (Chandrasekar)
 Devayani as Suryaprakash's wife
 Vinu Chakravarthy as Veerasamy
 FEFSI Vijayan as Sethupathy
 Anandaraj as Pasupathy and Pasupathy's father (dual role)
 Sindhu as Pasupathy's wife
 Mahanadi Shankar as Kanduvatti [Loan shark] Govinda
 Raj Kapoor as Paramasivam
 Ilavarasu as Ramalingam
 Sai Prashanth as Maavattam's son
 Aarthi as Bun
 Pandiarajan as Devaki's Potential Bridegroom
 Jasper as Contractor Sathya
 Madhan Bob as Veeraabaghu's Neighbour
 Manikka Vinayagam as Councillor(Maavattam)
 Gowtham Sundararajan as Police Inspector
 Mayilsamy as Maavattam's PA
 Singamuthu as Financier
 Aryan as Singampuli

Soundtrack

Music and background score were handled by D. Imman. The song "Dai Kaiya Vechikitu Summa Iruda" was a hit number of all the tracks in the album.

Reception
The film received mediocre reviews with Indiaglitz stating, "the story sinks in the quagmire of pulp and predictability". Behindwoods wrote "The story of the film is very well predictable to the climax. This film is not Sundar C's exceptional best. He was confused on satisfying the Telugu and the Tamil viewers at the same time (This film is also produced in Telugu), bringing in an average film."

References

External links 

2004 films
2004 action comedy films
Indian action comedy films
Films scored by D. Imman
2000s masala films
2000s Tamil-language films
Films directed by Sundar C.
2004 comedy films
Tamil films remade in other languages